The 2002–03 QMJHL season was the 34th season in the history of the Quebec Major Junior Hockey League. The league discontinues the AutoPro Plaque and Philips Plaque as those sponsorships expire. The St-Clair Group Plaque is renamed the Jean Sawyer Trophy. Sixteen teams played 72 games each in the schedule. The Baie-Comeau Drakkar finished first overall in the regular season winning their first Jean Rougeau Trophy. The Hull Olympiques won their fifth President's Cup, defeating the Halifax Mooseheads in the finals.

Final standings
Note: GP = Games played; W = Wins; L = Losses; T = Ties; OL = Overtime loss; PTS = Points; GF = Goals for; GA = Goals against

Lebel Conference

Dilio Conference

y-won division
x-made playoffs
complete list of standings.

Scoring leaders
Note: GP = Games played; G = Goals; A = Assists; Pts = Points; PIM = Penalty minutes

 complete scoring statistics

Playoffs

All-star teams
First team
 Goaltender - Adam Russo, Acadie-Bathurst Titan 
 Left defence - Jesse Lane, Hull Olympiques / Victoriaville
 Right defence - Maxime Fortunus, Baie-Comeau Drakkar 
 Left winger - Timofei Shishkanov, Quebec Remparts 
 Centreman - Joel Perrault, Baie-Comeau Drakkar 
 Right winger - Jonathan Gagnon, Rouyn-Noranda Huskies 
 Coach - Shawn MacKenzie, Halifax Mooseheads

Second team  
 Goaltender - Marc-Andre Fleury, Cape Breton Screaming Eagles 
 Left defence - Alexandre Rouleau, Val-d'Or Foreurs / Quebec Remparts
 Right defence - Bruno Gervais, Acadie-Bathurst Titan 
 Left winger - Olivier Filion, Acadie-Bathurst Titan 
 Centreman - Maxime Talbot, Hull Olympiques 
 Right winger - Steve Bernier, Moncton Wildcats 
 Coach - Richard Martel, Baie-Comeau Drakkar

Rookie team  
 Goaltender - David Tremblay, Hull Olympiques & Jean-Michel Filiatrault, Victoriaville Tigres / Quebec Remparts
 Left defence - Mario Scalzo, Victoriaville Tigres 
 Right defence - Jim Sharrow, Halifax Mooseheads 
 Left winger - Kevin Mailhiot, Drummondville Voltigeurs 
 Centreman - Petr Vrana, Halifax Mooseheads 
 Right winger - Olivier Labelle, Hull Olympiques 
 Coach - Judes Vallee, Victoriaville Tigres
 List of First/Second/Rookie team all-stars.

Trophies and awards
Team
President's Cup - Playoff Champions, Hull Olympiques
Jean Rougeau Trophy - Regular Season Champions, Baie-Comeau Drakkar
Luc Robitaille Trophy - Team that scored the most goals, Baie-Comeau Drakkar
Robert Lebel Trophy - Team with best GAA, Acadie-Bathurst Titan
Player
Michel Brière Memorial Trophy - Most Valuable Player, Joel Perrault, Baie-Comeau Drakkar 
Jean Béliveau Trophy - Top Scorer, Joel Perrault, Baie-Comeau Drakkar
Guy Lafleur Trophy - Playoff MVP, Maxime Talbot, Hull Olympiques    
Telus Cup – Offensive - Offensive Player of the Year, Pierre-Luc Sleigher, Victoriaville Tigres
Telus Cup – Defensive - Defensive Player of the Year, Marc-Andre Fleury, Cape Breton Screaming Eagles 
Jacques Plante Memorial Trophy - Best GAA, Adam Russo, Acadie-Bathurst Titan
Emile Bouchard Trophy - Defenceman of the Year, Maxime Fortunus, Baie-Comeau Drakkar 
Mike Bossy Trophy - Best Pro Prospect, Marc-André Fleury, Cape Breton Screaming Eagles 
RDS Cup - Rookie of the Year, Petr Vrana, Halifax Mooseheads
Michel Bergeron Trophy - Offensive Rookie of the Year, Petr Vrana, Halifax Mooseheads
Raymond Lagacé Trophy - Defensive Rookie of the Year, Mario Scalzo, Victoriaville Tigres
Frank J. Selke Memorial Trophy - Most sportsmanlike player, Patrick Thoresen, Baie-Comeau Drakkar 
QMJHL Humanitarian of the Year - Humanitarian of the Year, A.J. MacLean, Halifax Mooseheads & David Massé, Québec Remparts
Marcel Robert Trophy - Best Scholastic Player, Eric L'Italien, Rouyn-Noranda Huskies 
Paul Dumont Trophy - Personality of the Year, Jean-Francois Plourde, Sherbrooke Castors

Executive
Ron Lapointe Trophy - Coach of the Year, Shawn MacKenzie, Halifax Mooseheads        
John Horman Trophy - Executive of the Year, Sylvie Fortier, Baie-Comeau Drakkar 
Jean Sawyer Trophy - Marketing Director of the Year, Michel Boisvert, Shawinigan Cataractes

See also
2003 Memorial Cup
2003 NHL Entry Draft
2002–03 OHL season
2002–03 WHL season

References
 Official QMJHL Website
 www.hockeydb.com/

Quebec Major Junior Hockey League seasons
QMJHL